The 2010–11 Sporting de Gijón season was the third successive season that the club played in La Liga, the highest tier of football in Spain.

Overview
On 2 April 2011, thanks to a goal scored by Miguel de las Cuevas, Sporting beat Real Madrid 1–0 at Santiago Bernabéu Stadium to end Real manager José Mourinho's nine-year home league unbeaten run.

The club finally avoided relegation after beating 2–1 Racing de Santander at El Molinón in the 37th matchday.

Squad

From the youth squad

Competitions

La Liga

Results by round

League table

Matches

Copa del Rey

Matches

Squad statistics

Appearances and goals

|-
|colspan="14"|Players who appeared for Sporting de Gijón no longer at the club:

|}

References

External links
Profile at BDFutbol
Official website

Sporting de Gijón seasons
Sporting de Gijon